Orchard is a city in western Fort Bend County, Texas, United States, within the Houston–Sugar Land–Baytown metropolitan area. The community is located along State Highway 36 (SH 36) and the BNSF Railway between Rosenberg in Fort Bend County and Wallis in Austin County. The population was 352 at the 2010 census, down from 408 at the 2000 census.

Geography

Orchard is located at  (29.602015, –95.968821). Most of the city is north of the BNSF Railway tracks with its streets laid out north-south and east-west. Missouri Street is the major north-south artery, intersecting SH 36 and crossing the railroad. Missouri Street goes north as far as Brazos Elementary School. Kibler Road is an important east-west artery on which the town center is situated. Kibler Road starts at FM 1489 to the west of Orchard and ends at Long Lane to the east. FM 1489 intersects SH 36 to the west and goes south toward Tavener and north toward Simonton.

Demographics

As of the census of 2000, there were 408 people, 147 households, and 110 families residing in the city. The population density was 1,078.9 people per square mile (414.6/km). There were 156 housing units at an average density of 412.5/sq mi (158.5/km). The racial makeup of the city was 76.47% White, 8.09% African American, 1.47% Native American, 12.50% from other races, and 1.47% from two or more races. Hispanic or Latino of any national origin were 22.55% of the population.

There were 147 households, out of which 39.5% had children under the age of 18 living with them, 61.2% were married couples living together, 8.2% had a female householder with no husband present, and 24.5% were non-families. 21.1% of all households were made up of individuals, and 8.8% had someone living alone who was 65 years of age or older. The average household size was 2.78 and the average family size was 3.26.

In the city, the population was spread out, with 28.4% under the age of 18, 11.5% from 18 to 24, 31.1% from 25 to 44, 20.1% from 45 to 64, and 8.8% who were 65 years of age or older. The median age was 33 years. For every 100 females, there were 103.0 males. For every 100 females age 18 and over, there were 102.8 males.

The median income for a household in the city was $47,000, and the median income for a family was $59,063. Males had a median income of $40,089 versus $27,396 for females. The per capita income for the city was $21,329. About 7.3% of families and 8.9% of the population were below the poverty line, including 9.8% of those under age 18 and 17.1% of those age 65 or over.

Government and infrastructure 
The United States Postal Service operates the Orchard Post Office at 218 Missouri Street.

Fort Bend County does not have a hospital district. OakBend Medical Center serves as the county's charity hospital which the county contracts with.

Education
Orchard is served by the Brazos Independent School District (formerly Wallis-Orchard Independent School District). Students attend Brazos Elementary School (in the Orchard city limits), Brazos Middle School, and Brazos High School.

The designated community college for Brazos ISD is Wharton County Junior College (the legislation still states "Wallis-Orchard").

References

External links

 City of Orchard official website
 

Cities in Texas
Cities in Fort Bend County, Texas
Greater Houston